Households below average income is an annual publication on poverty statistics in the United Kingdom. The data is based on the Family Resources Survey.

Poverty is defined as having an equivalised household income below the 60% median line.

References

External links
HBAI

Family economics
Government publications
Household income
Measurements and definitions of poverty
Poverty in the United Kingdom
Publications with year of establishment missing